Rancid is a 2004 English-language Swedish thriller film, written by Jesper Ersgård and directed by Jack Ersgard.

Plot 

Once a promising young writer, John barely makes a living doing odd jobs. After a personal tragedy he is now stuck in a negative mood and dispassionate about his work. In the middle of his existential crisis he attends a high school reunion and meets three old friends, acquaintances he's tried to forget but who now appear like scary shadows from his past. Face to face with the love of his life, John tries to right old wrongs and get his life in order. John soon realizes that the past is best laid to rest or it might haunt him for all eternity. Wanted by the police for murder, he must choose between succumbing to his darkest desires or the light that will renew his faith in himself and his future.

References

External links 

2004 films
2004 psychological thriller films
English-language Swedish films
Swedish thriller films
Films set in the United States
2000s English-language films
2000s Swedish films